Admiral Pakenham may refer to:

John Pakenham (1743–1807), British Royal Navy vice admiral
Thomas Pakenham (Royal Navy officer) (1757–1836), British Royal Navy admiral
William Pakenham (Royal Navy officer) (1861–1933), British Royal Navy admiral